The Kimberley–Perth Canal was a proposal to channel water from the Fitzroy River in the Kimberley region of Western Australia via the Pilbara, to the southwestern capital of Perth, a distance of approximately .

History
In the late 1980s, Water Resources Minister Ernie Bridge proposed a water pipeline from the Kimberley.

The canal proposal was presented as part of Colin Barnett's unsuccessful 2005 state election campaign. 
As opposition leader, he ruled it out when campaigning for the 2008 election. 
In 2012, following Perth's driest July on record, Premier Barnett raised the proposal again, saying that "from a technical or engineering point of view, it's not difficult to do".

Water source
The Fitzroy River, with its catchments fed by variable tropical rainfall, is reported to deliver 9,200 gigalitres of mean annual flow, and at peak floods is stated as being "probably the largest river in Australia" when it has been reported to discharge up to 30,000 cubic metres per second into King Sound and the Indian Ocean.

Environmental issues

Previous cost estimates
Canal
Former State Government estimate - $14.5 billion
Colin Barnett - $2 billion

Pipeline
Ernie Bridge - $3 billion

References 

Water supply and sanitation in Western Australia
Canals in Australia